Parafrigoribacterium mesophilum is a species of bacteria from the family Microbacteriaceae which has been isolated from soil from the Bigeum Island in Korea.

References

Microbacteriaceae
Bacteria described in 2016
Monotypic bacteria genera